Erika Christine Sutton (born February 4, 1987) is an American soccer defender currently playing for Boston Breakers of Women's Professional Soccer.

Club career
She spent 2009 with Buffalo Flash of W-League.  She was sent on a week-long loan to Boston Breakers in July 2009.  With Buffalo, she appeared in 12 regular season games (988 minutes), scoring 4 goals and assisting on 1 other.  With Boston, she appeared in 1 game (90 minutes).  She earned a contract with Boston Breakers for the 2010 season.

References

External links
 Boston Breakers player profile
 Buffalo Flash player profile
 SoccerPlus Connecticut player profile
 Florida State player profile
 San Diego State player profile

1987 births
Living people
Women's association football defenders
Boston Breakers players
American women's soccer players
San Diego State Aztecs women's soccer players
Florida State Seminoles women's soccer players
Women's Professional Soccer players